When introduced by Billboard in March 1981, the Mainstream Rock chart was entitled Top Tracks and designed to measure the airplay of songs being played on album-oriented rock radio stations. The chart has undergone several name changes over the years, first to Top Rock Tracks in September 1984 and then to Album Rock Tracks in April 1986. The chart would not be called "mainstream" until 1996. The term "tracks" was used to distinguish itself from singles charts (such as the Billboard Hot 100) as songs played on rock radio were not always released as singles. When an established rock artist released a new album, for example, it was not uncommon for multiple songs from the album to become popular simultaneously.

The song that had the longest run atop the chart during the 1980s was "Start Me Up" by the Rolling Stones at 13 weeks from the beginning of September through the first week of December in 1981. No other song had a run of more than 10 weeks. Tom Petty (with and without the Heartbreakers) was the act with the most number ones during the 1980s with 6.

Number-one songs 

 – Number-one song of the year

Notes

References

Bibliography

External links
 Billboard website

Mainstream 1980s
United States Mainstream Rock